In geometry, the Perles configuration is a system of nine points and nine lines in the Euclidean plane for which every combinatorially equivalent realization has at least one irrational number as one of its coordinates. It can be constructed from the diagonals and symmetry lines of a regular pentagon, omitting one of the symmetry lines. In turn, it can be used to construct higher-dimensional convex polytopes that cannot be given rational coordinates, having the fewest vertices of any known example. All of the realizations of the Perles configuration in the projective plane are equivalent to each other under projective transformations.

History and related work
The Perles configuration was introduced by Micha Perles in the 1960s. It is not the first known example of an irrational configuration of points and lines.  describes an 11-point example, obtained by applying Von Staudt's algebra of throws to construct a configuration corresponding to the square root of two.

There is a long history of study of regular projective configurations, finite systems of points and lines in which each point touches equally many lines and each line touches equally many points. However, despite being named similarly to these configurations, the Perles configuration is not regular: most of its points touch three lines and most of its lines touch three points, but there is one line of four points and one point on four lines. In this respect it differs from the Pappus configuration, which also has nine points and nine lines, but with three points on every line and three lines through every point.

Construction from a regular pentagon
One way of constructing the Perles configuration is to start with a regular pentagon and its five diagonals, which form the sides of a smaller regular pentagon within the initial one. The nine points of the configuration consist of four out of the five vertices of each pentagon and the shared center of the two pentagons; the two missing pentagon vertices are chosen to be collinear with the center. The nine lines of the configuration consist of the five lines that are diagonals of the outer pentagon and sides of the inner pentagon, and the four lines that pass through the center and through corresponding pairs of vertices from the two pentagons.

Projective invariance and irrationality
A realization of the Perles configuration consists of any nine points and nine lines with the same intersection pattern. Every realization of this configuration in the Euclidean plane or, more generally, in the real projective plane is equivalent, under a projective transformation, to a realization constructed in this way from a regular pentagon. Because the cross-ratio, a number defined from any four collinear points, does not change under projective transformations, every realization has four points having the same cross-ratio as the cross-ratio of the four collinear points in the realization derived from the regular pentagon. But, these four points have  as their cross-ratio, where  is the golden ratio, an irrational number. Every four collinear points with rational coordinates have a rational cross ratio, so the Perles configuration cannot be realized by rational points. Branko Grünbaum has conjectured that every configuration that can be realized by irrational but not rational numbers has at least nine points; if so, the Perles configuration would be the smallest possible irrational configuration of points and lines.

Application in polyhedral combinatorics
Perles used his configuration to construct an eight-dimensional convex polytope with twelve vertices that can similarly be realized with real coordinates but not with rational coordinates. The points of the configuration, three of them doubled and with signs associated with each point, form the Gale diagram of the Perles polytope. Ernst Steinitz's proof of Steinitz's theorem can be used to show that every three-dimensional polytope can be realized with rational coordinates, but it is now known that there exist irrational polytopes in four dimensions. However, the Perles polytope has the fewest vertices of any known irrational polytope.

Notes

References

Configurations (geometry)
Polyhedral combinatorics